Sorocaba Futsal, currently known as Magnus Futsal for sponsorship reasons, is a Brazilian futsal club from Sorocaba, São Paulo. Founded in January, 2014 it has won one Liga Futsal and two Liga Paulista de Futsal.

History
Sorocaba Futsal was founded in January 2014 as Futsal Brasil Kirin after their first sponsor Brasil Kirin. In their first season Sorocaba won the Liga Futsal and the Liga Paulista de Futsal.

In 2016 Sorocaba changed to a new sponsor and adopted the name Magnus Futsal after them.

Club honours

National competitions
 Liga Futsal: 2014
 Supercopa do Brasil de Futsal: 2018

State competitions
 Liga Paulista de Futsal: 2014, 2017

International competitions
 Intercontinental Futsal Cup: 2016, 2018, 2019
 Copa Libertadores de Futsal: 2015

Current squad

References

External links
 Sorocaba Futsal official website
 Sorocaba Futsal LNF profile
 Sorocaba Futsal in zerozero.pt

Futsal clubs established in 2014
2014 establishments in Brazil
Futsal clubs in Brazil
Sports teams in São Paulo (state)